Central School is a public high school in Milton, Santa Rosa County, Florida, United States. It is located at 6180 Central School Road. The school's teams compete as the Jaguars.

References

Educational institutions in the United States with year of establishment missing
High schools in Santa Rosa County, Florida
Public elementary schools in Florida
Public high schools in Florida
Public middle schools in Florida